Dwik Vijayam is a 1980 Indian Malayalam film,  directed by M. Krishnan Nair and produced by P. K. Kaimal. The film stars Prem Nazir, Srividya, Adoor Bhasi and Hari in the lead roles. The film has musical score by G. Devarajan.

Cast
Prem Nazir as Vasu
Srividya as Soumini
Adoor Bhasi as Kannappan
 K. P. Ummer as Viswambaran
Hari
Jose as Ravi
 Cochin Haneefa
 Sankaradi as Shankar Panikkar
 K.P.A.C. Sunny as Baskaran
 Ram Kumar
Janardanan as Pankajakshan
Seema as Uma
 Sukumari as College Principal
 Raji
 Sharmila

Soundtrack
The music was composed by G. Devarajan and the lyrics were written by P. Bhaskaran.

References

External links
 

1980 films
1980s Malayalam-language films
Films directed by M. Krishnan Nair